Albert DeBurgo "Burke" McPhillips (18 January 1904 – 11 March 1971) was a Canadian politician. McPhillips was a Progressive Conservative party member of the House of Commons of Canada. He was a barrister and solicitor by career.

Early years
McPhillips was born in Victoria, British Columbia. He was the youngest son of the Hon. Mr. Justice Albert Edward McPhillips and Sophia Emily Davie, daughter of the late Hon. A.E.B. Davie, Q.C.

Military service
McPhillips served in the Canadian Army as Captain with The Duke of Connaught's Own Rifles of Canada from 1940 to 1946.

Political career
McPhillips was a candidate for the British Columbia Conservative Party in the Vancouver Centre (1933, 1941 provincial elections) and Victoria City (1952).

He was first elected at the Victoria riding in
the 1957 general election and was re-elected twice, in the 1958 and 1962 federal elections. McPhillips served as Parliamentary Secretary to the Minister of Fisheries from August 1962 to February 1963. His cousin, Davie Fulton, was Minister of Public Works around this time.

After completing his third term, the 25th Canadian Parliament, McPhillips left federal political office and was appointed to the Tariff Board of Canada.

He died suddenly at Ottawa on 11 March 1971. He was survived by his wife and two children.

References

External links
 

1904 births
1971 deaths
Canadian people of English descent
Canadian people of Irish descent
Lawyers in British Columbia
Members of the House of Commons of Canada from British Columbia
Politicians from Victoria, British Columbia
Progressive Conservative Party of Canada MPs
20th-century Canadian lawyers